Mount Odishaw is a high, prominent mountain, 3,965 m, forming a distinctive landmark 9 nautical miles (17 km) south-southwest of Mount Kaplan, in the Hughes Range. Discovered and photographed by R. Admiral Byrd on the Baselaying Flight of November 18, 1929, and surveyed by A.P. Crary in 1957–58. Named by the latter for Hugh Odishaw, Executive Secretary of the U.S. National Committee for the IGY.

Mountains of the Ross Dependency
Dufek Coast